(born July 21, 1964) is a Japanese animator, character designer, game designer and mecha designer, who works under the pen name "Akiman". Yasuda is a former employee of the video game company Capcom (joining in 1985) and has worked on many Capcom games, taking on various design roles for works such as the Final Fight series and Street Fighter II: The World Warrior (including their updates) under the pen name Akiman. He has also been involved in anime production, most notably Turn A Gundam, Overman King Gainer and Code Geass.  He also went to the United States to work on Red Dead Revolver for Angel Studios. When the studio was bought by Rockstar Games, he returned to Japan, where he officially left Capcom in 2003 and started working as a freelance artist.

Notable works

Anime
Turn A Gundam (1999-2000) - character designer
Overman King Gainer (2002-2003) - mecha designer
Code Geass (2006-2007) - mecha designer
Bodacious Space Pirates (2008–present) - animation character design
Gundam Reconguista in G (2014-2015) - mecha designer

Video games
1942 (1985) - NES version cover art
Hyper Dyne Side Arms (1986) - original artwork
Forgotten Worlds (1988) - game designer
Final Fight (1989) - planner
Street Fighter II (series) (1991) - planner
Captain Commando (1991) - planner
The Punisher (1993)
Super Street Fighter II (1993) - planner
Darkstalkers: The Night Warriors (1994)
X-Men: Children of the Atom (1994)
Darkstalkers 3 (1997)
Marvel Super Heroes (1995) - object design: Wolverine
Street Fighter Alpha 2 (1996)
Star Gladiator (1996) - character designer
X-Men vs. Street Fighter (1996) - character designer
Red Earth (1996) - original artwork
Street Fighter III (1997) - original artwork
Marvel Super Heroes vs. Street Fighter (1997) - original artwork
Marvel vs. Capcom: Clash of Super Heroes (1998) - original artwork
Plasma Sword: Nightmare of Bilstein (1998) - character designer
Street Fighter Alpha 3 (1998) - character designer
Power Stone (1999) - character designer
Street Fighter III: 3rd Strike (1999) - character designer
Final Fight Revenge (1999)
Tech Romancer (2000) - design supervisor
Power Stone 2 (2000) - character designer
Red Dead Revolver (2004) - character designer
MS Saga: A New Dawn (2005) - main character & package design
Culdcept Saga (2006) - card illustration: Sword Princess
Fushigi no Dungeon: Furai no Shiren DS (2006) - cover art
Brave Story: New Traveler (2006) - character designer
Sangokushi Taisen DS (2007) - card illustration: Enclosure Empress
Kidou Senshi Gundam: Giren no Yabou - Axis no Kyoui V (2009) - cover art
Star Ocean: Integrity and Faithlessness (2016) - character designer
Street Fighter V (2016) - guest alternate costume designer
Star Ocean: Anamnesis (2016) - character designer
Star Ocean: The Divine Force (2022) - character designer

Other works
Tomie: Re-birth (2001 film; cameo appearance as Waiter)
∀ Gundam: Wind of Moon (∀ Gundam: Tsuki no Kaze, 2004–2005) (manga)
Giga69 (magazine coverart)
Akira Yasuda ∀ Gundam Designs (∀ Gundam series artbook)
Akiman Cover Girls (poster book of Giga69 magazine covers)
"Haji" DVD cover (included in "[nine*nine]" live audio compilation by Gackt, Oct. 29, 2008)
Kousoku M-ko figurine (character design and insert comic)
Eureka Magazine (magazine coverart)
Street Fighter Art Comic Anthology (cover art)
Street Fighter Artworks HA 20th Anniversary Art Book (cover art)
Gundam Rock Music Album (cover art)
Super Smash Bros. for Nintendo 3DS and Wii U (Ryu character illustration)

References

External links
 
 Akiman's blog 
 
 Video Interview with Yasuda on the Archipel channel

1964 births
Anime character designers
Capcom people
Japanese animators
Japanese video game designers
Living people
Place of birth missing (living people)
Sunrise (company) people